Lypsimena tomentosa is a species of beetle in the family Cerambycidae. It was described by Chemsak and Linsley in 1978. It is known from Venezuela.

References

Pogonocherini
Beetles described in 1978